Arnionys Manor is a residential manor in Molėtai district, Arnionys village.

References

External links
 Miestai.net: Arnioniai Manor (reconstruction photos) 
 

Manor houses in Lithuania
Classicism architecture in Lithuania